Steven D. Binder (born July 23, 1971) is an American screenwriter and film and television producer. He currently works on NCIS as a writer, executive producer, and showrunner.  In addition, he is featured in the documentary, Journey to the Flames: 10 Years of Burning Man. He is both a battery tech patent holder and an iOS software developer. He is brothers with the renowned entrepreneur, Jeff Binder.

Filmography
 Eating L.A.
 The Invisible Man (2000 TV series)
 Tremors (TV series)
 The Dead Zone (TV series) 
 Journey to the Flames: 10 Years of Burning Man
 National Lampoon's Totally Baked: A Potumentary
 NCIS (TV series)

References

External links
 

American male screenwriters
American television producers
Living people
Glenbrook North High School alumni
1971 births
Showrunners